Lucy Johnson may refer to:
 Lucy Ann Johnson, American-Canadian woman reported missing in 1965, found in 2013
 Lucy Johnson (soccer), Australian soccer player
 Lucy Johnson (Grange Hill)

See also
 Luci Baines Johnson, American businesswoman and philanthropist